Abdikokhor Marifaliev (born 1 May 1971) is a former Uzbekistan international football player and manager.

Career
Marifaliev began playing football for Sokhibkor Khalkabad in the Soviet Second League. In 1991, he joined Soviet Top League side FC Pakhtakor Tashkent. After the fall of the Soviet Union, Marifaliev would spend most of his career playing in the Uzbek League, winning five championships (with Pakhtakor Tashkent in 1992, with Navbahor Namangan 1996, with MHSK in 1997 and with Do'stlik in 1999 and 2000).

He moved to Greece in 1998, but played only one Superleague match for PAOK F.C. before returning to Uzbekistan.

He made 32 appearances and scored 5 goals for the senior national team between 1992 and 2001.

Following his playing career, Marifaliev became a football manager, leading Metallurg Bekabad during the 2008 Uzbek League season.

References

External links

Profile at KLISF

1971 births
Living people
Soviet footballers
Uzbekistani footballers
Uzbekistani expatriate footballers
Uzbekistan international footballers
Pakhtakor Tashkent FK players
Navbahor Namangan players
PFC Lokomotiv Tashkent players
PAOK FC players
FC Kyzylzhar players
Soviet Top League players
Super League Greece players
Expatriate footballers in Greece
Expatriate footballers in Kazakhstan
Uzbekistani expatriate sportspeople in Greece
Uzbekistani expatriate sportspeople in Kazakhstan
Association football midfielders
Asian Games gold medalists for Uzbekistan
Asian Games medalists in football
Footballers at the 1994 Asian Games
Medalists at the 1994 Asian Games